Roberto Lopes da Costa (born October 6, 1966 in Bacabal, Maranhão) is a beach volleyball player from Brazil. He won the bronze medal in the men's beach team competition at the 1999 Pan American Games in Winnipeg, Manitoba, Canada, partnering Franco Neto. He represented his native country at the 1996 Summer Olympics in Atlanta, Georgia.

References

1966 births
Living people
Brazilian men's beach volleyball players
Beach volleyball players at the 1996 Summer Olympics
Olympic beach volleyball players of Brazil
Beach volleyball players at the 1999 Pan American Games
Pan American Games bronze medalists for Brazil
Pan American Games medalists in volleyball
Medalists at the 1999 Pan American Games
Sportspeople from Maranhão